Ningirima was a Mesopotamian goddess associated with incantations, attested already in the Early Dynastic period. She was also associated with snakes, fish and water. According to the god list An = Anum and other sources, she was regarded as a sister of Enlil. While suggestions that she was conflated with the mongoose deity Ninkilim can be found in modern literature, this theory finds no direct support in primary sources.

Her importance declined in the second millennium BCE, but in some locations, such as Ur, she was still worshiped after the Achaemenid conquest of Mesopotamia in the first millennium BCE.

Character
The typical early writing of the name, known from Tell Fara, Abu Salabikh and Ebla is dNin-A.MUŠ.ḪA.DU, meaning "mistress of snake and fish water" in Sumerian. The sequence A.MUŠ.ḪA.DU could be read as girima. Later the name was commonly spelled syllabically, for example dNi-gi-ri-ma. 
A text from Lagash refers to her as the "great true-eyed one of heaven," igi-zi-gal-an-na.

Ningrima was associated with incantations, water, fish and snakes. In Akkadian, she could be referred to as bēlat tēlilti, "mistress of purification." One Old Babylonian incantation refers to her as the "mistress" of snakes, indicating she was believed to have control over these animals.

Ningirima's position in the Mesopotamian pantheon of the third millennium BCE was high, though in later periods she had to compete with deities such as Asalluhi and Marduk who shared her association with incantations.In the Ur III period, even though most incantations were seemingly composed in Nippur, deities associated with Eridu, such as Asalluhi and Namma, started to predominate in this genre of texts. As a result, Ninigrima's role was reduced to that of a divine purifier associated with basins of sacred water, rather than an universal divine exorcist. 

In astronomical texts Ningrima was associated with the so-called scorpion star.

It has been proposed that depictions of a goddess wearing a so-called "battlemented crown" and holding two bottles can be identified as depictions of Ningirima.

Worship
Muru, a city near Bad-tibira, was a cult center of Ningirima. In later periods, it was also the cult center of the mongoose god Ninkilim and his wife, Nin-Muru. An inscription of Lugalzagesi mentionsNingirima and addresses her as the "lady of Uruk." Further evidence connecting her with this city includes a god list from Mari and literary texts from Fara (Shuruppak). She was  also worshiped in Fara itself. It is possible that she also had a cult center named Girim, located in the proximity of Uruk-Kullaba. While Babylon was not associated with her, a few isolated references are known from this city too, including a description of rites performed in E-karzagina, a temple of Ea.  However, despite these associations, she was chiefly worshiped as a deity disconnected from any specific location.

Ningirima is attested in god lists from between the Early Dynastic and Neo-Assyrian periods, including the Fara, Mari, Nippur, Weidner, Sultantepe, Old Babylonian An = Anum forerunner and An = Anum lists. 

An Early Dynastic hymn listing a large number of deities mentions Ninigirima. An Akkadian hymn dedicated to her from the Sargonic period is also known. For uncertain reasons, Ningirima, addressed as "crossroads of the gods," also appears in connection with Babylon in a late syncretic hymn to Zarpanit.

The existence of clergy of Ningirima is confirmed by formulas in incantations from Fara and Ebla, and by administrative texts from Puzrish-Dagan which mention gudu (a type of priest) of this goddess.

In incantations, Ningirima could be invoked against snakes, demons, and various illnesses. Early Dynastic exorcism formulas were dedicated to her. She is attested in this type of texts as far west as Ugarit. A ritual text from Nineveh mentions the "holy water vessel of Ningirima and Kusu." In association with this container she occurs as late in the Achaemenid and Seleucid periods.

Ninigrima already appears in theophoric names from the third millennium BCE, one example being Ur-Ningirima. Attestations are known from the Fara and Ur III periods from Fara, Ur, Uruk and possibly Zabalam. A single female theophoric name invoking Ningirima is known from the neo-Babylonian period. She occurs in a single late theophoric name from Ur as well, Ningirima-ilat, "Nigirima is divine," which belonged to a woman who lived during the reign of Artaxerxes II. Paul-Alain Beaulieu assumes that her presence in the pantheon of this city well into Achaemenid times was the result of an association with Ninazu, whose cult was well established in Ur.

Associations with other deities
The god list An = Anum refers to Ningirima as the sister of Enlil. She is also his sister in a currently unpublished Sumerian incantation. According to Wilfred G. Lambert a reference to her as a sister of Anu is also known, but Frank Simons noted that this might be based on an erroneous reading of a damaged tablet, which might simply contain another attestation of the standard sibling relation between Ningirima and Enlil. In some cases, due to their overlapping functions she could instead be referred to as sister of Asalluhi, and thus as a daughter of Enki.

Ningirima, Nisaba and Kusu could function as a triad of purification goddesses. Another trinity consisted out of her, Kusu and Girra. This group attested in a consecration rite for priests of Enlil, in various incantations, and in royal inscriptions of Esarhaddon. In some incantations, she could also be associated with Nanshe.

An early hymn compares her to the snake god Irḫan. Due to both of them corresponding to the same star, she could be associated with Ishara, who also shared her association with snakes. Manfred Krebernik notes that in the god list An = Anum both of them belong to the court of Enlil. A few texts, including Šurpu and the Weidner god list, group together Tishpak, Ninazu and Ningirima, always in that order, based on their shared affinity with snakes.

Other similarly named deities
It has been proposed that Ningirima and Ninkilim were considered to be analogous, based on the similarity of their names, a shared cult center (Murum) and other factors, but according to Manfred Krebernik this proposal is implausible. He points out the following differences: while Ningirima is always female, Ninkilim could be regarded as a male deity; their placement in god lists always differs; while both were associated with snakes, the nature of this connection was not identical.

Despite her association with Ninazu, it is not likely that she was ever confused with his similarly named wife, Ningirida.

Ningirima should not be confused with a similarly named deity (dNin-gi-rim-ma or dEn-gi-rim-ma, reading of the first sign uncertain) who was the name of Enki in the role of a gardener god.

References

Bibliography

}

Mesopotamian goddesses
Magic goddesses
Snake goddesses